The 2006–07 Algerian Championnat National was the 45th season of the Algerian Championnat National since its establishment in 1962. A total of 16 teams contested the league, with JS Kabylie as the defending champions.

Team summaries

Promotion and relegation 

Teams promoted from Algerian Division 2 2006-2007 
 USM Annaba
 AS Khroub
 MC Saïda

Teams relegated to Algerian Division 2 2007-2008
 Paradou AC
 ASM Oran
 CA Batna

League table

Season statistics

Top scorers

References

External links
2006–07 Algerian Championnat National

Algerian Ligue Professionnelle 1 seasons
1
Algeria